Meredith Wilson or Meredith Willson may refer to:

 Robert Meredith Willson (1902–1984), American flautist, composer, conductor, musical arranger, bandleader, playwright and author, best known for The Music Man
 O. Meredith Wilson (1909–1998), American historian and academic administrator
Meredith J. Wilson, co-discoverer in 1988 of Mowat-Wilson syndrome